Shoulder sleeve insignia (SSI) are cloth emblems worn on the shoulders of US Army uniforms to identify the primary headquarters to which a soldier is assigned. The SSI of some army divisions have become known in popular culture.

Airborne/infantry 
Note: several insignia are of World War II formations. Note: US infantry divisions were not formed under the following numbers:"53"; "54"; "56"; "57"; "58"; "60"; "64";"67";"68".

Unnumbered

Cavalry

Armored

See also 
 Brigade insignia of the United States Army
 Corps Insignia of the United States Army
 Field Army Insignia of the United States Army
 Miscellaneous shoulder sleeve insignia of the United States Army

Sources & references 

World War I Insignia

External links 

Divisions of the United States Army
Heraldry of the United States Army
United States military unit insignia